Simon Stevin was a Dutch language academic journal in pure and applied mathematics, or Wiskunde as the field is known in Dutch. Published in Ghent, edited by Guy Hirsch, it ran for 67 volumes until 1993. The journal is named after Simon Stevin (1548–1620), a Flemish mathematician and engineer.

In 1994 a second series was started from volume 1 under the title Bulletin of the Belgian Mathematical Society - Simon Stevin, and publishes mainly in English. Volumes of the second series are available from Project Euclid: Bulletin of the Belgian Mathematical Society - Simon Stevin.

The editor-in-chief is Stefaan Caenepeel.

References

 Belgian Mathematical Society

Mathematics journals
Publications established in 1947
Multilingual journals
5 times per year journals